Xanthodaphne argeta is a species of sea snail, a marine gastropod mollusk in the family Raphitomidae.

Description
The length of the shell attains 43 mm, its diameter 20 mm.

(Original description) The polished shell is short-fusiform, snow white, eight- whorled. The protoconch is eroded in the specimen. The  whorls are full, oppressed in front of the suture, elsewhere gently rounded. The transverse sculpture consists of delicate incremental lines. The spiral sculpture consists of obscure almost microscopic striae and a few close set extremely fine threads on the siphonal canal. The aperture is elongated. The anal notch is very shallow and  rounded; leaving only a faint slightly flattened fasciole. The outer lip is sharp, simple, arched well forward, especially anteriorly. The body is without callus. The columella is thin, white, short, slightly twisted. The 
siphonal canal is short, very wide and  hardly differentiated

Distribution
This marine species was found near the Galapagos Islands at a depth of 1485 m.

References

 McLean, 1971a:124, fig. 139

External links
 

argeta
Gastropods described in 1890